"You Make Me Feel" is the debut single by the Belgian trance project AnnaGrace. It was released in Belgium on June 23, 2008 and then in the United States on August 26. The track reached number one on the U.S. Billboard Hot Dance Airplay chart in its October 25, 2008 issue.

The track was given a digital-only release in the UK at the beginning of 2009 through Hard2Beat Records, which included a new "UK Radio Edit", but it failed to make an impact on the charts.

Track listing
CD Single (Belgium and United States)
 "You Make Me Feel" (Radio Edit) – 3:06
 "You Make Me Feel" (Extended Mix) – 5:07
 "You Make Me Feel" (Francesco Diaz & Thomas Gold Remix) – 8:20
 "You Make Me Feel" (VooDoo & Serano Remix) – 5:26
 "You Make Me Feel" (VooDoo & Serano Club Remix) – 5:26
 "You Make Me Feel" (John Luniz Remix) – 7:24
 "You Make Me Feel" (John Luniz Dub Remix) – 7:24

CD Single (United Kingdom)
 "You Make Me Feel" (UK Radio Edit) – 2:38
 "You Make Me Feel" (UK Extended Mix) – 5:41
 "You Make Me Feel" (Bimbo Jones Remix) – 6:38
 "You Make Me Feel" (VooDoo & Serano Remix) – 5:26
 "You Make Me Feel" (Total Control Remix) – 5:12
 "You Make Me Feel" (John Luniz Remix) – 7:26

12" Viynl (Belgium)
A1. "You Make Me Feel" (Extended Mix) – 5:07
A2. "You Make Me Feel" (Francesco Diaz & Thomas Gold Remix) – 8:20
B1. "You Make Me Feel" (John Luniz Dub Remix) – 7:24
B2. "You Make Me Feel" (Voodoo & Serano Club Remix) – 5:26

Release history

Chart performance

References

2008 songs
2008 debut singles
AnnaGrace songs
Songs written by Peter Luts
Songs written by Annemie Coenen